The 2001 Texas Longhorns football team represented the University of Texas during the 2001 NCAA Division I-A football season. They were represented in the Big 12 Conference in the South Division. They played their home games at Darrell K Royal–Texas Memorial Stadium in Austin, Texas. The team was coached by head coach Mack Brown.

Schedule

Roster

References

Texas
Texas Longhorns football seasons
Holiday Bowl champion seasons
Texas Longhorns football